Takakura (高倉) may refer to:

 Emperor Takakura (1161–1181), emperor of Japan
 Ken Takakura (1931–2014), Japanese actor
 Miki Takakura (born 1960), Japanese actress
 Takakura family, a branch of the Japanese Fujiwara clan
 Takakura (2003, September 12), a game character in Harvest Moon: A Wonderful Life

Japanese-language surnames